Adam Leventhal (born 13 November 1979, in London) is an English television presenter, journalist and Watford F.C. supporter.

He started his career in 1995 at Capital Radio, London working on the award-winning Capital Gold Sportstime. Initially working in production and editing, he moved on to live football reporting and soon became an established member of the Capital Sport team under the stewardship of Jonathan Pearce working across the Capital Network.

While studying Broadcast Journalism at Nottingham Trent University he continued to work for Capital covering Premier League football around the UK.

On his return in 2002, he worked for Arsenal F.C., commentating and reporting on every home and away domestic and European match, while producing and presenting exclusive content for Arsenal.com.

In all he worked at Capital for 8 years, covering FIFA World Cup, UEFA Euro, UEFA Champions League, Premier League and Wimbledon Championships.

In 2003 he joined Sky Sports News. Initially he covered all sports as a key member of their reporting team. In 2006, he started a specialist correspondent role in cricket, covering tours in India, the West Indies, Sri Lanka, Australia and South Africa.

While on tour he reported live on major news stories, including the death of Bob Woolmer at the Cricket World Cup in 2007 and the Mumbai terrorist attacks in 2008.

In 2010 he became a presenter on Sky Sports News. He also launched 'Sky Sports News Plus', a podcast available to download or watch online.

Away from sports journalism, Leventhal has a strong association with music radio, having presented and produced radio programmes on the Emap network (Kiss 100 London and Radio Aire Leeds) and also Ministry of Sound Radio.

While at university he won two BBC Student Radio Awards in consecutive years for 'Best Show' and 'Best Specialist Music Programme'.

References

English television presenters
1979 births
Living people
Sportspeople from London
British sports broadcasters
Alumni of Nottingham Trent University